The 1981 WFA Cup Final was the 11th final of the FA Women's Cup, England's primary cup competition for women's football teams. It was the eleventh final to be held under the direct control of Women's Football Association (FA).

Match

Summary

The game ended 4-2 to Southampton Women's F.C.

References

External links
 
 Report at WomensFACup.co.uk

Cup
Women's FA Cup finals
May 1981 sports events in the United Kingdom